N-acetylglucosaminyl-diphospho-decaprenol L-rhamnosyltransferase (WbbL) is an enzyme with systematic name dTDP-6-deoxy-beta-L-mannose:N-acetyl-alpha-D-glucosaminyl-diphospho-trans,octacis-decaprenol 3-alpha-L-rhamnosyltransferase. This enzyme catalyses the following chemical reaction

 dTDP-6-deoxy-beta-L-mannose + N-acetyl-alpha-D-glucosaminyl-diphospho-trans,octacis-decaprenol  dTDP + alpha-L-rhamnopyranosyl-(1->3)-N-acetyl-alpha-D-glucosaminyl-diphospho-trans,octacis-decaprenol

This enzyme requires Mn2+ or Mg2+.

References

External links 

EC 2.4.1